Cerro La Mesa or La Mesa or Cerro de la Mesa is a mountain in the Cordillera de la Ramada range of the Andes, in Argentina. La Mesa means table in Spanish. The name of the mountain comes its flat and long summit ridge (there are six summits, the 6200m being the highest). Despite the dry climate of the area, there are significant glaciers flowing down the southern and the eastern flank of the mountain. Its slopes are within the administrative boundaries of the Argentinean city of Calingasta, Province of San Juan.

First Ascent 
La Mesa was first climbed by Hans Schöenberger (Austria) in January 1, 1971. The polish 1934 expedition (Viktor Ostrowski, Jan Kazimierz Dorawski, S. Osiecki, J. Narkienwicz-Jodko, J. Dorawsky, S. Daszynski and A. Karpinski) summited a 'southeast pinnacle' February 10. These were the words of the author, therefore not to the main summit 1.5 km away.

Elevation 
Other data from available digital elevation models: SRTM yields 6158 metres, ASTER 6167 metres, ASTER filled 6161 metres, TanDEM-X 6200 metres. The height of the nearest key col is 5225 meters, leading to a topographic prominence of 955 meters. La Mesa is considered a Mountain Massif according to the Dominance System  and its dominance is 15.45%. Its parent peak is Mercedario and the Topographic isolation is 9.5 kilometers.

Notes

External links 

 Elevation information about La Mesa
 Weather Forecast at La Mesa

See also
List of mountains in the Andes

Mountains of Argentina
Six-thousanders of the Andes